Episode 8 may refer to:

 "Episode 8" (Humans series 1), the eighth and final episode of the first series
 "Episode 8" (Twin Peaks), the first episode of the second season of the American mystery television series
 "Series 8, Episode 8" (Spooks), the series eight finale of the British espionage television series
 Star Wars: The Last Jedi (also Star Wars: Episode VIII – The Last Jedi), a 2017 American epic space opera film

See also
 8 (disambiguation)
 "Eight Episodes", a science fiction short story by Robert Reed
 Episode (disambiguation)
 "Part 8" (Twin Peaks), the eighth episode of the third season of the TV series